Sodom and Gomorrah were infamous Biblical cities.

Sodom and Gomorrah may also refer to:
 Sodom and Gomorrah (1922 film), an Austrian silent movie
 Sodom and Gomorrah (1962 film), a Franco-Italian-American movie
 Sodom and Gomorrah: The Last Seven Days, a 1975 pornographic movie by the Mitchell Brothers
 Sodom and Gomorrah (play), a play by Jean Giraudoux
 Sodom and Gomorrah, volume four in the Marcel Proust novel In Search of Lost Time
 "Sodom and Gomorrah", a disco song by Village People on Macho Man
 "Sodom & Gomorra", a heavy metal song by Accept on Death Row
 "Sodom & Gomorrah", a heavy metal song by Sodom on Genesis XIX
 Sodom and Gomorrah, ring names of the professional wrestling team Mark Jindrak and Matt Morgan
 Sodom and Gomorrah (comics), fictional characters from DC Comics

See also
 Sodom (disambiguation) 
 Gomorrah (disambiguation)